Archimandrite Eleftherios Noufrakis (born Emmanuel Noufrakis, 1872 or 1874, Alones, Rethymno, Crete; died 5 August 1941, Athens) was a Greek Orthodox military priest. He is known for performing the first and only Divine Liturgy in the Hagia Sophia since the 1453 fall of Constantinople.

References

1870s births
1941 deaths
Greek Eastern Orthodox priests
Greek military chaplains
Greek military personnel of the Greco-Turkish War (1919–1922)
People from Lappa, Rethymno